The Air Command Tandem is an American autogyro designed and produced by Air Command International of Caddo Mills, Texas.  The aircraft is supplied as a kit for amateur construction or as a ready-to-fly aircraft.

Design and development
The Tandem kit was designed to comply with the US Experimental - Amateur-built rules. It features a single main rotor, a two-place tandem seating open cockpit with a fairing and a windshield, tricycle landing gear and a four-cylinder, air-cooled, four-stroke,  Subaru EJ22 automotive conversion or  Rotax 912ULS four-stroke aircraft engine in pusher configuration.

Specifications (Tandem)

See also
List of rotorcraft

References

External links

Photo of the Air Command Tandem

Tandem
1990s United States sport aircraft
Homebuilt aircraft
Single-engined pusher autogyros